Burlington College was a private college in Burlington, Vermont. It offered associate, bachelor's, and master's degrees, as well as several professional certificates. Although regionally accredited by the New England Association of Schools and Colleges, the college was placed on probation in July 2014 for failing to meet the accreditor's standards regarding financial resources. The college ceased operations in 2016.

History
Burlington College started in 1972 as the Vermont Institute of Community Involvement. A handful of students met in the living room of founder Dr. Steward LaCasce. It originally served adult learners and veterans.

In 2007, the college had 204 students at its main campus in buildings in downtown Burlington. Since most were part-time, this worked out to 130 "full-time equivalents". An additional 30 students studied off-campus.

In 2010, Jane O’Meara Sanders oversaw the purchase of 33 acres of property to be used for college expansion, with the resulting significant debt to be covered by already pledged donations and tuition from planned increased enrollment over five years. Sanders departed shortly after, with Christine Plunkett assuming the position of president.

In 2014, the regional accreditor of the college placed it on probation because of its financial condition, and votes of no confidence were given to Plunkett from organizations representing students, faculty, and staff. She resigned shortly thereafter. In 2015, the college resold 27.5 acres of the land it had purchased. In May 2016, the college board of trustees decided to close the school. According to David A. Graham, writing in The Atlantic, some of the school's financial difficulties dated back to 2010 when the board of directors and Sanders purchased the property in 2010. The original $11 million of debt had been worked down to about $2 million, but because of remaining debt and "insufficient financial resources", the school's bank declined to renew their $1 million line of credit and the school was facing the loss of their accreditation. Local Burlington developer Eric Farrell planned to purchase the campus from the bank to develop a park and housing.

Presidents
 1972–1994: J. Steward LaCasce
 1994–2002: Daniel Casey
 2002–2003: Mary Clancy
 2004–2011: Jane O’Meara Sanders
 2012–2014: Christine Plunkett
 2014: Michael Smith (interim)
 2014–2016: Carol A. Moore

Campus

In 2010, Burlington College announced its intention to purchase the property of the Roman Catholic Diocese of Burlington for use as its main campus. The college sold its former campus to the Committee for Temporary Shelter, a welfare agency, and purchased  of waterfront diocese property in early 2011. In 2015, the college arranged to sell a local developer a parcel of land, as well as the former diocesan orphanage attached to the office and classroom building. The developer, Farrell Real Estate, drafted a master plan to convert the orphanage to student housing. The college retained the original diocese building for classrooms, studios, art rooms, film and radio, laboratories, etc., and the surrounding property.  At the press conference announcing the closure, the school stated that the developer would purchase the college's North Avenue campus from the bank.

Academics
Burlington College offered a span of undergraduate programs in the arts, writing and literature, film studies, photography, fine arts, legal studies, transpersonal psychology/psychology, human services, media activism, and graphic design, and an individualized undergraduate and graduate degree program. The college offered students study-abroad options within Europe, and in 2008, Burlington College became one of the very few universities in the United States to offer a study-abroad program in Havana, Cuba in conjunction with the University of Havana. Students had the ability to spend a semester at the university or take one of several one-week trips offered throughout the academic year. Burlington College joined several other universities in the United States by offering students the option of a narrative evaluation in addition to traditional transcripts.

In connection with the undergraduate legal studies program, Burlington College held an articulation agreement with Vermont Law School which allowed Burlington College graduates to proceed into the Juris Doctor and joint Juris Doctor programs at Vermont Law School upon successful completion of their undergraduate studies. Burlington College also offered an affiliation with the Vermont Woodworking School in Fairfax. The courses in woodworking and fine craftsmanship were offered for credit to support both Associate of Arts and Bachelor of Fine Arts degree programs. In addition to woodworking skills, students took the usual general education requirements of the college. The degree could be taken on campus, at a distance, or in combination. Burlington College offered a low-residency Master of Arts degree. The degree was individualized and tailored to meet the academic needs and focus of individual graduate students.

Rankings
In August 2011, The Daily Beast and Newsweek ranked Burlington College as the number-one school in the United States for free-spirited students (free-spirited defined as schools where, "there are no mandatory classes, tests or official letter or number grades"). In October 2013, Newsweek named Burlington College as among the 10 colleges in the United States to have the highest rate of participation in student internships in their study field.

References

External links
 

 
Defunct private universities and colleges in Vermont
Education in Burlington, Vermont
Educational institutions established in 1972
Buildings and structures in Burlington, Vermont
Education in Chittenden County, Vermont
1972 establishments in Vermont
Educational institutions disestablished in 2016
2016 disestablishments in Vermont